Saikhan may refer to:

 Saikhan, Bulgan, a sum (district) of Bulgan Province in northern Mongolia
 Saikhan, Selenge, a sum (district) of Selenge Province in northern Mongolia

See also
 Saikhan-Ovoo (disambiguation)